Clonkill is a townland in County Westmeath, Ireland.

Clonkill is one of 34 townlands of the civil parish of Rathconnell in the barony of Moyashel and Magheradernon in the Province of Leinster. 

The neighbouring townlands are: Downs to the north, Balreagh to the north–east, Killynan (Cooke) to the east, Loughagar More to the south, Toberaquill to the west and Monkstown to the north–west.

In the 1911 census of Ireland there were 15 houses and 62 inhabitants in the townland.

References

External links
Map of Clonkill at openstreetmap.org
Clonkill at the IreAtlas Townland Data Base
Clonkill at Townlands.ie
Clonkill at The Placenames Database of Ireland

Townlands of County Westmeath